Look Up and Laugh is a 1935 British comedy film directed by Basil Dean and starring Gracie Fields, Alfred Drayton and Douglas Wakefield. The film is notable for featuring an appearance by Vivien Leigh in an early supporting role.

Plot
Gracie Pearson (Fields) is a singer/comedian who returns home to enjoy a little holiday, but there is trouble brewing. First, she has to use all of her hard-earned money to pay for part of what her brother owes to a money lender. Then when they go to see their father, they find he has collapsed due to the Plumborough Market (where he has a stall) is threatened with demolition to make way for a department store. She receives a telegram offering a West End singing job, but decides to try to save the market instead.

As time runs out, Gracie rallies the stall keepers together through a series of ever more hilarious schemes in their attempts to save their livelihoods.

Cast
 Gracie Fields as Gracie Pearson
 Vivien Leigh as Marjorie Belfer
 Douglas Wakefield as Joe Chirk
 Alfred Drayton as Belfer
 Billy Nelson as Alf Chirk
 Harry Tate as Turnpenny
 Huntley Wright as Ketley
 Robb Wilton as Mayor
 Morris Harvey as Rosenbloom
 Maud Gill as Miss Canvey
 Norman Walker as Brierley
 Tommy Fields as Sidney Pearson
 Helen Ferrers as Lady Buster 
 Kenneth Kove as Piano Assistant
 D. J. Williams as Malpas

Uncredited:
 Frank Atkinson as Debt Collector 
 Florence Gregson as Mr. Pearson's Housekeeper
 Arthur Hambling as Sam 
 James Harcourt as Mr. Pearson
 Anthony Holles as Store Manager
 Mike Johnson as Man Outside Market
 Jack Melford as Journalist
 Kenneth More as Bit Part
 Ernest Sefton as Borough Engineer

Reception
Writing for The Spectator, Graham Greene described the film as "light [with] a pleasant local flavour" the plot of which is "genuinely provincial". Greene praised Priestley's writing and opined that the film distinguishes itself "by the sense that a man's observation and experience, as well as his invention, has gone into its making".

Home media
This film was released as part of the Gracie Fields collector's edition which also includes the films Sally in Our Alley (1931), Looking on the Bright Side (1932), Love, Life and Laughter (1934), Sing As We Go (1934), Queen of Hearts and The Show Goes On (1937), these are on 4 discs. Two films each on three of the discs with the other film on disc four.

References

External links
 

1935 films
1935 comedy films
British comedy films
Films set in England
Films directed by Basil Dean
Associated Talking Pictures
British black-and-white films
1930s British films